Evergreen Mountain is a mountain located in Greene County, New York north of Spruceton, New York. Herdman Brook drains the southeastern portion of the mountain and flows south before converging with West Kill. West Kill flows westwards, south of Evergreen Mountain and the Schoharie Creek flows eastwards, north of the mountain.

References

Mountains of Greene County, New York
Mountains of New York (state)